Hugo Friedrich Schrader (26 July 1902 – 22 February 1993) was a German television and film actor.

Selected filmography
 How Do I Become Rich and Happy? (1930)
 The Champion Shot (1932)
 Wedding at Lake Wolfgang (1933)
 The Royal Waltz (1935)
 Until Money Departs You (1960)
 Frontier Hellcat (1964)

Television appearances
 Drei Damen vom Grill
 Jeder stirbt für sich allein (1962)

References

External links
 

1902 births
1993 deaths
German male film actors
German male television actors
Actors from Frankfurt
20th-century German male actors